Iván Ernesto Pérez Vargas (born 29 June 1971) is a water polo player from Spain. He was born in Havana, Cuba, but became a Spanish citizen. He was a member of the national team that finished in sixth place at the 2004 Summer Olympics in Athens, Greece. He also competed at the 2008 and 2012 Olympics. He represented Cuba at the 1992 Summer Olympics.

In 2003 Pérez, a player from CN Barcelona, ended up in fifth place with the national side at the 2003 World Aquatics Championships in his home town of Barcelona. He twice won the world title with Spain, at the 1998 World Aquatics Championships in Perth, Western Australia, and at the 2001 World Aquatics Championships in Fukuoka, Japan.

See also
 Spain men's Olympic water polo team records and statistics
 List of players who have appeared in multiple men's Olympic water polo tournaments
 List of men's Olympic water polo tournament top goalscorers
 List of World Aquatics Championships medalists in water polo
 List of world champions in men's water polo

References

External links
 

1971 births
Living people
Sportspeople from Havana
Cuban male water polo players
Cuban emigrants to Spain
Spanish male water polo players
Olympic water polo players of Cuba
Olympic water polo players of Spain
Water polo players at the 1992 Summer Olympics
Water polo players at the 2004 Summer Olympics
Water polo players at the 2008 Summer Olympics
Water polo players at the 2012 Summer Olympics
World Aquatics Championships medalists in water polo
Mediterranean Games gold medalists for Spain
Competitors at the 2005 Mediterranean Games
Mediterranean Games medalists in water polo